The Tenants is the sixth novel of Bernard Malamud, published in 1971.

Background
Malamud began the initial composition of the novel in 1969 and completed it in 1971. Its plot concerns a rivalry between two writers—one of them a Jew and the other an African-American— who are the last two persons remaining in a soon to be condemned apartment building. Before Malamud began writing this novel, he'd already "published two short stories treating relationships between blacks and Jews": "Angel Levine" (1955) and "Black Is My Favorite Color" (1963). And in at least one other story, "The Mourners" (1955), he had examined the fraught relationship between a tenant and a landlord. After he'd completed the novel, Malamud himself described The Tenants as a "tight, tense book, closer to the quality of short fiction."

When Malamud was asked, during an interview, what "set off" the writing of his novel, he replied: "Jews and blacks, the period of the troubles in New York City; the teachers strike, the rise of black activism, the mix-up of cause and effect. I thought I'd say a word." Malamud's biographer explains the genesis of the novel this way:

Book summary

A  quick synopsis of the book's story was provided in the book jacket:

As the story unfolds, all the building's residents have moved out with the exception of Lesser, who believes he's the sole remaining occupant and plans on staying until he completes his third novel. Lesser believes that it is crucial for him to remain in familiar surroundings so as not to break his writing routine. Then he hears the sound of a typewriter and soon discovers that it belongs to Willie Spearmint (who eventually adopts  Bill Spear as a pen name) who has taken over one of the abandoned apartments as his writing space.

The time of the novel seems to be set in the final years of the 1960s, "a time of racial strife affecting both the book's Jewish and black characters." The novel's point of view is through Harry Lesser and "is rendered in third-person-limited narration."

See also
 The Tenants, a 2005 film adaptation of the book

Further reading
Leslie Fiedler, "Negro and Jew: Encounter in America," in No! in Thunder: Essays on Myth and Literature (London: Eyre and Spottiswoode, 1963), 241.
Herbert Mann, "The Malamudian World: Method and Meaning," Studies in AmericanJewish Literature 4 (Spring 1978): p 7
David R. Mesher, "Names and Stereotypes in Malamud's The Tenants," Studies in AmericanJewish Literature 4 (Spring 1978): p 62
Cynthia Ozick, "Literary Blacks and Jews," in Malamud: Critical Essays, ed. Field and Field, p 90
Israel Shenker, "For Malamud It's Story," The New York Times Book Review. (3 October 1971): p 22
Warren Rosenberg. Legacy of Rage: Jewish Masculinity, Violence, and Culture. (Univ of Mass Press, 2009.
Alvin Kernan, The Imaginary Library - contains a chapter on The Tenants. : pp.153-206

References

External links
Race as a Cause for Discrimination and “Othering”, Bernard Malamud’s The Tenants: a Case Study
Commentary Magazine review of The Tenants
Book Review: Library of America's Bernard Malamud volumes in The Wall Street Journal March 21, 2014
Bernard Malamud: A Writer's Experience By Celia B. Betsky, The Harvard Crimson: January 22, 1973
The Otherworldly Malamud By Mark Athitakis in HUMANITIES, March/April 2014 | Volume 35, Number 2

1971 American novels
Novels about writers
Novels set in Brooklyn
Novels about antisemitism
American novels adapted into films
Novels by Bernard Malamud
Farrar, Straus and Giroux books